The Joint Institute for Marine and Atmospheric Research (JIMAR) is an oceanic, atmospheric, and geophysical research institute that is sponsored jointly by the National Oceanic and Atmospheric Administration (NOAA) Office of Oceanic and Atmospheric Research (OAR) and the University of Hawaii (UH). It is one of 16 NOAA Cooperative Institutes (CIs).

The JIMAR research themes are:
 Tsunamis (and other long period ocean waves)
 Climate
 Equatorial oceanography
 Fisheries oceanography
 Tropical meteorology
 Coastal research

References

External links
 Joint Institute for Marine and Atmospheric Research (JIMAR)

Office of Oceanic and Atmospheric Research
Research institutes in Hawaii
Oceanographic organizations
Meteorological research institutes